The San Diego City Attorney is an elected official in San Diego, California. The City Attorney serves as the city government's lawyer and as a criminal prosecutor for misdemeanor violations and infractions. The city attorney is elected for four years, and may serve up to two terms. The current city attorney is Mara Elliott. Predecessors include Jan Goldsmith (2008-2016), Mike Aguirre (2004-2008), Casey Gwinn (1996-2004), and John W. Witt (1969-1996). Ms. Elliott is the first woman, and first Latina, to serve as City Attorney for San Diego, California.

Composition
The San Diego City Attorney's Office has four divisions.
 Civil Advisory Division 
 Civil Litigation Division 
 Criminal Division 
 Community Justice Division

List of City Attorneys
The following list shows San Diego City Attorneys since the incorporation of the City of San Diego. From 1852 until 1888 the City government was dissolved due to a bankruptcy and there was no official city attorney.

References

External links
 Election history, City Attorney, City of San Diego

1850 establishments in California